The Diocese of Sodor and Man is a diocese of the Church of England. Originally much larger, today it covers just the Isle of Man and its adjacent islets. Today, the bishop's office is in Douglas and the cathedral is in Peel. The diocese is not generally called either "Sodor diocese" or "Man diocese".

Structure
The diocese administers 40 churches, which are organised in 15 ecclesiastical parishes. Formerly there were 27 such parishes, but their number has been reduced by extensive pastoral reorganisation between 2012 and 2015. Each parish forms a separate benefice, with the exception of two (Onchan; Lonan and Laxey) which are combined in a team ministry with a team rector and a team vicar. The Archdeacon of Man is the incumbent (vicar) of the parish of St George and All Saints, Douglas.

The Cathedral Church of St German at Peel (informally styled Cathedral Isle of Man) is one of five churches in the parish of the West Coast, the incumbent (vicar) of which is ex officio Dean of the Cathedral.

The parishes are grouped into four "Mission Partnerships" (Eastern, Western, Southern and Northern) for purposes of mission and inter-parochial co-operation. Originally informal (from 2010), these mission partnerships became legal entities on 1 January 2013 under the Mission and Pastoral Measure (Isle of Man) 2012. They have completely replaced the traditional rural deanery structure, and the former deaneries and the office of rural dean have been legally abolished. Each mission partnership has a team leader appointed by the bishop from amongst the constituent clergy.

In addition to the parish clergy, the bishop licenses a few ordained chaplains. These include the school chaplain of King William's College (where there is an elegant Anglican chapel, with scissor-braced roof with canopied stalls designed by James Cowle), and the hospital chaplain of the island's main Noble’s Hospital, where an interdenominational chapel is staffed by the Anglican chaplain together with two colleagues, one Roman Catholic, and one Free Church.

Early history

The Norwegian diocese of Sodor was formed in 1154, covering the Hebrides and the other islands along the west coast of Scotland. The name in the original Norse was Suðreyjar (Sudreys or "southern isles"), in contrast to the Norðreyjar, the "northern isles" of Orkney and Shetland. The Isle of Man was included in with these southern isles. This diocese was a suffragan of the archdiocese of Nidaros (Trondheim).

Norway controlled all these islands until 1266, when they were ceded to Scotland. The Isle of Man was detached from the Scottish islands and came under the suzerainty of the Kings of England in 1334. Thereafter it was held by feudal Lords of Man (the Stanleys, Earls of Derby, from 1406 to 1736 and the Dukes of Atholl from 1736) until the lordship was purchased by the British Crown in 1765. The right to appoint the Bishop of Sodor and Man belonged to the Lords of Man, and continued to be exercised by the Dukes of Atholl after the revestment in 1765 until it was surrendered to the Crown in 1828. The Isle of Man was never incorporated into the Kingdom of England, or the United Kingdom, but is a Crown Dependency. In common with the rest of the Church of England, at the English Reformation the Diocese left the Roman Catholic Church under Henry VIII. The bishop Thomas Stanley was not a supporter of the reforms (particularly the reallocation of his Diocese from the Province of Canterbury to the Province of York in 1542) and was deprived of office by Henry, but was briefly reinstated under Mary I, who restored Stanley to office, but was separated once again under the religious settlement under Elizabeth I. Since the Isle of Man was not part of the Kingdom of England, the Act of Uniformity 1662 passed at the English Restoration did not apply to it, so Thomas Wilson was free to introduce worship in the Manx language during his episcopate (1697–1755), and to resolve issues of clergy discipline resulting from the Isle of Man's unique status.

Usage of Sodor and Man
As stated above, the Isle of Man was included in the Southern islands ("Sudreys"); the addition of "and Man" may have been made in the 17th century in ignorance of the proper application of the name of Sodor to the bishopric of Man. It is suggested that St Patrick's Isle, being the location of the cathedral for the Norse diocese of Sodor, by some confusion itself became known as Sodor. By the late 16th century the terms "Sodor" and "Man" had become interchangeable, the bishopric being named in legal documents as "Sodor" or "Man" or "Sodor and Man", or sometimes all three, for the avoidance of doubt (e.g. the grant of the lordship of the Island to the Earl of Derby in 1610 included "the Patronage of the Bishopricke of the said Isle of Mann, and the Patronage of the Bishopricke of Sodor, and the Patronage of the Bishopricke of Sodor and Mann").

Until 1604 the bishops signed themselves "Sodorensis"; from 1604 to 1684, sometimes they used "Soderensis" and sometimes "Sodor and Man"; between 1684 and 2007 all bishops signed "Sodor and Man" or "Sodor and Mann". However, the present bishop signs "Sodor as Mannin", the Manx Gaelic equivalent, as did his predecessor.

Later history

The original cathedral of the Diocese of Sodor and Man was on St Patrick's Isle at Peel. This cathedral fell into disuse during the 18th century and for many years the bishop's chapel at Bishopscourt, near Kirk Michael, served as a pro-cathedral. This was a Gothic building, rebuilt in 1814 and again in 1858, and dedicated to St Nicholas.  In 1979 Bishopscourt was sold, and the following year the parish church of St German in Peel was designated as "the Cathedral Church of St German" by Act of Tynwald.

An 1836 proposal to subsume the diocese into the Diocese of Carlisle was defeated, as was the 1875 proposal that the Diocese of Liverpool (then at the planning stage, founded 1880) should include the Isle of Man.

Since the Isle of Man is not part of the United Kingdom, the bishop is never a Lord Spiritual and cannot sit in the House of Lords of the United Kingdom. However he is an ex officio member of the Legislative Council of the Isle of Man. Nevertheless, in common with other Church of England Crown Appointments, the appointment of the bishop is still made on the advice of the Prime Minister of the United Kingdom. However, unlike diocesan bishops in England, who are formally elected by the canons of the cathedral church in accordance with the monarch's congé d'elire, the Bishop of Sodor and Man is appointed directly by the monarch by letters patent.

The name of the diocese served as inspiration for the fictional Island of Sodor, the primary setting of Wilbert Awdry's The Railway Series and the later Thomas the Tank Engine TV series, which place the island in the Irish Sea.

List of churches 
Last fully updated 18 September 2018.

Statistics

Eastern Mission Partnership

Northern Mission Partnership

Southern Mission Partnership

Western Mission Partnership

See also
List of churches on the Isle of Man
Bishop of Sodor and Man
Bishop of the Isles
List of Church of England dioceses

References

Church of England Statistics 2002 
Manx Church Legislation

External links
An Account of the Diocese of Sodor and Man

 
1154 establishments in Europe

Christianity in medieval Scotland
Dioceses established in the 12th century
Sodor and Man
Sodor and Man
Inner Hebrides
Religious organizations established in the 1150s